The black ruff (Centrolophus niger) is a medusafish, the only member of the genus Centrolophus. Other common names include rudderfish and blackfish.

Description
The black ruff has a robust fusiform body shape. The dorsal fin has five spines and 37 to 41 soft rays, the anal fin has three spines and 20 to 24 soft rays. The bases of these fins have a fleshy sheath clad with scales that partially conceals the rays. The head is grey and the body colour violet-black, dark brown or purplish, with a paler belly. The fins are darker than the body colour. Sometimes there are indistinct spots or a marbled pattern.

Distribution and habitat
The black ruff is known from the northwestern Atlantic Ocean, where its range extends from Nova Scotia to Massachusetts, the northeastern Atlantic and the Mediterranean Sea; also from the southeastern Atlantic and the Indian Ocean, its range including South Africa and Australia and New Zealand, as well as the Southern Ocean. It is largely absent from the tropics. It is occasionally found in the waters around the British Isles, where it has been recorded off County Galway, County Donegal and the Isles of Scilly. In 1901, a specimen was caught in a salmon net in the Firth of Forth and was presented to the Edinburgh Museum.

Ecology
Juvenile fish live in surface waters but adults live at greater depths where they may form small schools. The diet consists mainly of  small fish, squid, large crustaceans, and any other animals that may be encountered in mid-ocean.

References
 
 Tony Ayling & Geoffrey Cox, Collins Guide to the Sea Fishes of New Zealand, (William Collins Publishers Ltd, Auckland, New Zealand 1982) 

Centrolophidae
Fish of Hawaii
Fish of the Atlantic Ocean
Fish of the Indian Ocean
Monotypic fish genera
Fish described in 1789